Anna R. Findlay (1885-1968) was a British artist and printmaker. She was known for her elegant colour linocut and woodcut prints of mostly topographical scenes.

Biography
Findlay lived in Glasgow and studied at the Glasgow School of Art from 1912 to 1914. She studied under Claude Flight at the Grosvenor School of Modern Art and, for a period, her work was influenced by the style of the Futurists. Findlay spent some years living with her brother, an army officer, and his wife at St Ives in Cornwall. In Cornwall, Findlay  exhibited with, and was a member of, the St Ives Society of Artists. But, by 1938, she had returned to Scotland. Findley was also a member of, and exhibited with, the Glasgow Society of Artist Printers, which was founded in 1921, and the Glasgow Society of Lady Artists. In Scotland, she lived at Killearn in Stirlingshire and exhibited at the Royal Scottish Academy from 1926 to 1942, with the Royal Glasgow Institute of the Fine Arts and, on at least one occasion, with the Aberdeen Artists Society. Findlay also had exhibitions at the Redfern Gallery and at Manchester City Art Gallery. The British Museum holds an example of her 1932 print, The paper mill.

References

1885 births
1968 deaths
20th-century British printmakers
20th-century Scottish women artists
Alumni of the Glasgow School of Art
Alumni of the Grosvenor School of Modern Art
Artists from Glasgow
Scottish wood engravers
Scottish women painters
Women engravers
20th-century engravers